Soraca Jonin was an Irish religious patron.

Jonin was a member of the Mac Jonin (Jennings) family of Ironpool, Kilconly, Tuam. Her family were one of the many branches of the Burke family of Connacht. She was related to General Charles Edward Jennings de Kilmaine.

In 1678, Soraca erected a chapel for the family in Ross Errilly Friary, Headford, which bears the following inscription:

Pray for Soraca Jonin who built this chappell for herselfe, her husband Tho. Kievach Jonin and her sonn, David, the year 1678

Her husband, Thomas, appears to have been uncle to General Charles Edward Jennings de Kilmaine.

References
 Irish Swordsmen of France, pp. 294–95, Richard Hayes, Dublin, 1934.

17th-century Irish women
People from County Galway
17th-century Irish people